Dog Run is a  long 1st order tributary to Buffalo Creek in Washington County, Pennsylvania.

Course
Dog Run rises about 2 miles south of Dunsfort, Pennsylvania, in Washington County and then flows north and northwest to join Buffalo Creek at Dunsfort.

Watershed
Dog Run drains  of area, receives about 40.2 in/year of precipitation, has a wetness index of 300.49, and is about 78% forested.

See also
List of Pennsylvania Rivers

References

Rivers of Pennsylvania
Rivers of Washington County, Pennsylvania